Torsten Schippe  is a retired German international rugby union player and, from August 2010 to April 2013, the coach of the German national rugby union team.

As a player, Schippe won two German titles with his club, DSV 78 Hannover, in 1990 and 1991. He took over as coach of DRC Hannover in 1993, a position he held for ten years, in which he won five national championships and two national cups. He remained with DRC as the Director of Sports after his time as coach of the club. Since 2007, he is also an official IRB Coach Educator.

Schippe coached the German national team from 2000 to 2001 and again since 1 August 2010. In this position, he is supported by the South African Jakobus Potgieter as his assistant. He had succeeded Peter Ianusevici as German coach in 2000, after a disastrous campaign, and transformed the team to a winning side. However, he was dismissed in a surprise move by the leadership of the German Rugby Federation despite achieving good results. As coach of Germany, he succeeded Rudolf Finsterer, who, in turn, had succeeded him in 2001.

Schippe once more resigned from his post as coach of Germany in April 2013, citing work commitments as the reason.

Honours

Player
 German rugby union championship
 Champions: 1990, 1991
 German rugby union cup
 Runners up: 1990

Coach
 German rugby union championship
 Champions: 1998, 1999, 2000, 2001, 2002
 Runners up: 2003
 German rugby union cup
 Winners: 2002, 2003
 Runners up: 1997

References

External links
 Deutscher Rugby-Verband - Official Site of the German Rugby Federation

Living people
German rugby union coaches
Germany national rugby union team coaches
German rugby union players
Germany international rugby union players
DSV 78 Hannover players
Sportspeople from Hanover
Year of birth missing (living people)